Nicholas James Loftin (born September 25, 1998) is an American professional baseball shortstop in the Kansas City Royals organization.

Amateur career
Loftin attended W. B. Ray High School in Corpus Christi, Texas, where he played baseball. As a senior in 2017, he batted .465 with three home runs alongside going 11–4 with a 1.10 ERA on the mound. He originally committed to play college baseball at Texas A&M University–Corpus Christi, but later switched his commitment to Baylor University. Undrafted in the 2017 Major League Baseball draft, he enrolled at Baylor.

In 2018, Loftin's freshman year at Baylor, he appeared in 55 games (making 53 starts), batting .306 with six home runs and 36 RBIs, earning Freshman All-American honors alongside being named to the Big 12 Conference All-Second Team and All-Freshman Team. As a sophomore in 2019, Loftin started 53 games in which he hit .323 with six home runs, 41 RBIs, and 18 doubles. He was named to the All-Big 12 First Team. That summer, he played for both the Hyannis Harbor Hawks of the Cape Cod Baseball League and for the United States collegiate national baseball team. Prior to Loftin's junior year in 2020, he was named the Big 12 Conference Preseason Player of the Year. Over 14 games for his junior season, he batted .298 with two home runs and 15 RBIs before the college baseball season was cut short due to the COVID-19 pandemic.

Professional career
Loftin was selected 32nd overall by the Kansas City Royals in the 2020 Major League Baseball draft. On June 23, 2020, Loftin signed with the Royals on a $3 million bonus. He did not play a minor league game in 2020 due to the cancellation of the minor league season caused by the pandemic.

Loftin was assigned to the Quad Cities River Bandits of the High-A Central for the 2021 season, slashing .289/.373/.463 with ten home runs and 57 RBIs over ninety games. He was assigned to the Northwest Arkansas Naturals of the Double-A Texas League to begin the 2022 season. In early August, he was promoted to the Omaha Storm Chasers of the Triple-A International League. Over 128 games between the two teams, he slashed .254/.333/.403 with 17 home runs and 66 RBIs.

References

External links

Baylor Bears bio

1998 births
Living people
Baseball players from Texas
Baseball shortstops
Baylor Bears baseball players
Hyannis Harbor Hawks players
Sportspeople from Corpus Christi, Texas
United States national baseball team players
Quad Cities River Bandits players
Northwest Arkansas Naturals players
Wisconsin Woodchucks players